Aurèle Vandendriessche (born 4 July 1932) is a retired Belgian marathon runner, who won silver medals at the 1962 and 1966 European Championships. He competed at the 1956, 1960 and 1964 Olympics with the best result of seventh place in 1964. Twice winner of the Boston Marathon (1963 and 1964), he recorded his best time there, 2:17:44 in 1965, while finishing fourth.

At the 1960 Olympics, Abebe Bikila, followed barefoot at the rear of the lead pack, which was moving at a scorching pace and included Arthur Keily, Bakir Benaïssa, Rhadi Ben Abdesselam who was the reigning world cross-country champion, Bertie Messitt, the marathon world record holder Sergey Popov, and Vandendriessche. Bikila won, setting a world record at 2:15:16.2. After they dispatched the rest of the field by 25 kilometers, Abdesselam stayed with Bikila until the final 500 meters, finishing second in 2:15:41.6. Vandendriessche abandoned the race. He placed seventh at the 1964 Olympics, where Bikila won again with a new worlds record.

Achievements

References

External links

 Profile

1932 births
Living people
Belgian male long-distance runners
Athletes (track and field) at the 1956 Summer Olympics
Athletes (track and field) at the 1960 Summer Olympics
Athletes (track and field) at the 1964 Summer Olympics
Olympic athletes of Belgium
People from Anzegem
Boston Marathon male winners
European Athletics Championships medalists
Sportspeople from West Flanders